This is a list of regions of Guinea-Bissau by Human Development Index as of 2023 with data for the year 2021.

See also
List of countries by Human Development Index

References 

Guinea-Bissau
Guinea-Bissau